Feroz Ahmad (born 1938) is a retired academic, historian and political scientist who taught at different universities, including the University of Massachusetts Boston, Tufts University, Harvard University, Columbia University and Yeditepe University. He is one of the leading scholars studying modern history of Turkey.

Early life and education
Ahmad was born in New Delhi in 1938. He received a bachelor's degree in history from Delhi University and a master's degree in the same field from the University of London. He obtained a PhD from the University of London under the supervision of Bernard Lewis, and his thesis was about the Young Turk Revolution in 1908.

Career
Ahmad worked at several US universities between 1966 and 2003. He was Emeritus Professor of history at the University of Massachusetts at Boston. From 2006 he taught at Yeditepe University, Istanbul.

Work
Ahmad has published many books and articles, most of which are concerned with Ottoman and modern Turkish history. His major books are as follows: The Young Turks: The Committee of Union and Progress in Turkish Politics, 1908–1914 (1973); An Annotated Chronology of Multi-Party Politics in Turkey (1976, with Bedia Turgay Ahmad); From Unionism to Kemalism, Essays (1985); Turkish Experiment in Democracy (1994); The Making of Modern Turkey (1995); Turkey: The Quest for Identity (2006); From Empire to Republic: Essays on the Late Ottoman Empire and Modern Turkey (2008); and The Young Turks and the Ottoman Nationalities: Armenians, Greeks, Albanians, Jews, and Arabs, 1908–1918 (2014).

Personal life
Ahmad's wife was a Turkish woman, Bedia Turgay Ahmad (died December 2018), whom he married in 1964. He has twin girls from this marriage. He has been staying at Darüşşafaka Residence in Istanbul since 2017.

Honors
Ahmad is the recipient of the Order of Merit of the Republic of Turkey, which was awarded to him in August 2014.

References

20th-century Indian historians
1938 births
Academic staff of Yeditepe University
Scholars from Delhi
Delhi University alumni
Alumni of the University of London
University of Massachusetts Boston faculty
21st-century Indian historians
Indian expatriate academics
Indian expatriates in the United States
Scholars of Ottoman history
Historians of Turkey
Living people